Ernest "Big" Crawford (July 31, 1897 – March, 1956, Memphis, Tennessee) was an American blues double bassist.  He played with Muddy Waters, Sunnyland Slim, Little Walter, Memphis Minnie, Jimmy Rogers, Big Maceo, Big Bill Broonzy, Washboard Sam, Memphis Slim, and Mahalia Jackson.

Discography

With Muddy Waters
The Real Folk Blues (Chess, 1948–54, [1966])
More Real Folk Blues (Chess, 1950-53 [1967])

References

1897 births
1956 deaths
American blues musicians
American double-bassists
Male double-bassists
20th-century American musicians
Slap bassists (double bass)
20th-century double-bassists
20th-century American male musicians
Blues musicians from Tennessee